Holly Carpenter (born 9 October 1991) is an Irish model and beauty pageant titleholder who was crowned Miss Ireland 2011 on 13 August 2011. She represented Ireland in the Miss World pageant held on 6 November 2011 in London, England. Since 2015 she has written a Friday column for the Herald newspaper on topical issues such as positive body image and dating.

Media career 
Her modelling career began in 2011 when she was entered into the Miss Ireland national beauty pageant by a friend which she won but was subsequently unplaced in the Miss World 2011, despite being many bookmakers' favourite to finish within the top 5. She ranked only 42nd in the competition which she attributes to not having a polished promotional video.  Having won Miss Ireland, her modelling career took off and she found work easily in Ireland and the UK.

Britain and Ireland's Next Top Model
In 2013, Carpenter was named among 28 semi-finalists for the 9th cycle of Britain & Ireland's Next Top Model. She was chosen as one of the 14 finalists competing for the title. After several appearances in the bottom three/four, she was eliminated in episode 9 and placed 7th.

Celebrity MasterChef Ireland
In January 2017, Carpenter appeared on Celebrity MasterChef Ireland. She was eliminated in the first week of the competition.

Dancing with the Stars
Carpenter appeared on the 2019 series of the Irish edition of Dancing with the Stars. She was eliminated from the competition in week four.

Personal life
Carpenter was born and raised in Raheny, Dublin, Ireland. She is the granddaughter of the social diarist Terry Keane In 2011, she was working towards an arts degree in textiles at the National College of Art and Design. She speaks English, Irish and French.

She was in relationship with Leinster and Ireland Rugby International Cian Healy for two years before they split up in July 2014.

Between 2015 and 2016 she dated Danny O’Reilly of Irish rock band The Coronas.

She dated football pundit, Richie Sadlier for five months in 2017. They split after Carpenter claimed Sadlier, who is twelve years her senior, was too old for her.

References

1991 births
Living people
Miss Ireland winners
Miss World 2011 delegates
People from Raheny
Alumni of the National College of Art and Design
Irish female models
Britain & Ireland's Next Top Model contestants
Beauty pageant contestants from Ireland
Rugby union players' wives and girlfriends